USCGC Duane (WPG-33/WAGC-6/WHEC-33) (earlier known as the USCGC William J. Duane) was a cutter in the United States Coast Guard. Her keel was laid on May 1, 1935 at the Philadelphia Navy Yard, Philadelphia, Pennsylvania. She was launched on June 3, 1936 as a search and rescue and law enforcement vessel.

The Treasury-class Coast Guard cutters (sometimes referred to as the "Secretary" or 327-foot class) were all named for former Secretaries of the Treasury Department.  The cutter Duane was named for William J. Duane, who served as the third Secretary of the Treasury to serve under President Andrew Jackson.

Ship history
After fitting out, she departed the Philadelphia Navy Yard on October 16, 1936 and arrived at Oakland, California on November 24.  She was then assigned to temporary duty in Honolulu, and arrived there on December 9, 1936, to participate in the U.S. colonization efforts of the Line Islands in the Pacific. Duane then returned to her permanent homeport of Oakland, arriving on February 25, 1937. For the next two years, she joined the Bering Sea Patrol Force for annual cruises of that area. In mid-1937 her name was shortened to merely Duane.  In September 1939 she was assigned to duty with Destroyer Division 18, conducting neutrality patrols along the Grand Banks (these patrols were known as "Grand Banks Patrols"), as ordered by President Franklin Roosevelt. She departed Oakland on September 7, 1939 and arrived at her new homeport of Boston on September 22, 1939. Here she conducted four Grand Banks patrols, from October through December, 1939, completing her final patrol on January 12, 1940.

World War II

Duane was then assigned to weather patrols in the mid-Atlantic, and also carried out a survey of the western coast of Greenland in mid-1940. In late 1940 she was fitted with additional armaments, receiving anti-aircraft and anti-submarine weapons. She was assigned to permanent duty with the U.S. Navy on 11 September 1941, and was designated WPG-33. On 1 April 1942 Duane was reassigned from weather patrols to convoy escort duty during the battle of the Atlantic.

Duane was converted to an combined operations-communications headquarters ship in 1944.  Upon completion, she was to have been taken over by the Navy and assigned the hull number AGC-6.  However, this plan was dropped and she was retained for Coast Guard service (her designation then became WAGC-6).  Duane was attached to the Eighth Amphibious Force in the Mediterranean Sea, and took part in "Operation Dragoon", the invasion of southern France, in August 1944. She remained in the Mediterranean until July 1945, when she returned to the United States and reverted to her previous designation WPG-33.

Post-war
The ocean-weather station program was permanently established by multi-national agreement soon after the end of World War II.  The Coast Guard was then assigned the duty of manning those stations for which the U.S. accepted responsibility.  As the 327s completed conversion to ocean station vessels, each immediately deployed to their new stations. For most of the next twenty years, Duane and her sisters, except  which was stationed in the Pacific, alternated duty between weather stations "Charlie" (850 miles northeast of St. Johns, Newfoundland), "Bravo" (250 miles northeast of Cape St. Charles, Labrador); "Delta" (located 650 miles southeast of Argentia, Newfoundland); and "Echo" (850 miles east northeast of Bermuda).  Sometime later these became known simply as "ocean stations."  Although the crew probably considered these patrols boring, they were important to the continued growth and safety of international over-water commercial air flights. On 1 May 1965 all the vessels in her class were re-classified as high endurance cutters and she was redesignated WHEC-33.

Vietnam and after

On 4 December 1967 Duane was assigned to Coast Guard Squadron Three located off the coast of Vietnam, where she served as the flagship for Coast Guard squadron. Duane permanently departed Vietnamese waters on July 28, 1968. Duane then again returned to ocean station duty but this task was rapidly becoming obsolete.  The stations were decommissioned in the early 1970s, having been overtaken by electronic aids to navigation such as LORAN. The mid-1970s were a period of transition for the Coast Guard with the passage of the Fisheries Conservation and Management Act and the nation's shift towards increased interdiction of narcotics smugglers.  These operations called for off-shore patrols of up to three weeks.

Decommissioning and disposal

Duane left Coast Guard service and was decommissioned on August 1, 1985 as the oldest active U.S. military vessel and was laid up in Boston for the next two years.

Duane is now a historic shipwreck near Key Largo, Florida, United States. The cutter was deliberately sunk on November 27, 1987 to create an artificial reef. It is located a mile south of Molasses Reef. On May 16, 2002, it was added to the U.S. National Register of Historic Places.

Decorations
Presidential Unit Citation
American Campaign Medal
World War II Victory Medal
China Service Medal
National Defense Service Medal with one battle star
Philippine Presidential Unit Citation
Vietnam Service Medal with two battle stars
Republic of Vietnam Armed Forces Vietnam Campaign
American Defense Service Medal
European-African-Middle Eastern Campaign Medal with four battle stars
Asiatic-Pacific Campaign Medal with four battle stars
Navy Occupation Service Medal
Philippine Liberation Ribbon with two battle stars
Republic of Vietnam Gallantry Cross with Palm and Frame Unit Citation

In media

 "People Who Make a Difference," a 1991 episode of the PBS television series Return to the Sea, includes footage of a dive on the wreck of Duane.

References

External links

 USCG Cutter Duane at Florida's Office of Cultural and Historical Programs
 The Wreck of the Duane at Florida Keys National Marine Sanctuary Shipwreck Trail

National Register of Historic Places in Monroe County, Florida
Shipwrecks of the Florida Keys
Treasury-class cutters
Ships of the United States Coast Guard
Shipwrecks on the National Register of Historic Places in Florida
Maritime incidents in 1987
Ships sunk as artificial reefs
1936 ships
Ships sunk as dive sites
Ships built in Philadelphia